Karyes is a settlement in Mount Athos of the Athonite monastic community. The 2011 Greek census reported a population of 163 inhabitants. It is the largest settlement in Mount Athos.

The major church at Karyes is the Protaton, which is the church of the Protos, or president of the monastic community. The famed Axion Estin icon is kept at the Protaton. Each of the twenty monasteries of Mount Athos also has a konaki, or representative's residence, at Karyes.

Koutloumousiou Monastery is located just a few hundred meters to the south of the town center of Karyes.

History
Serbian Bishop Saint Sava built a church and cell at Karyes, where he stayed for some years, becoming a Hieromonk, then an Archimandrite in 1201. He wrote the Karyes Typicon during his stay there, and a marble inscription of his work still exists. In 1219 Sava becomes the first Archbishop of Serbia.

In the year 1283, Latin Crusaders during the reign of the Byzantine Emperor Michael Paleologos, attacked Mount Athos. They tortured and hanged the Protos, and sacked the Protaton, murdering many of the monks. These monks are commemorated as martyrs by the Eastern Orthodox Church on December 5 (for those churches which follow the traditional Julian Calendar, December 5 falls on December 18 of the Gregorian Calendar).

Geography

Climate

Gallery

References

Populated places in Mount Athos
Saint Sava